Harry E. Siman (September 20, 1869 in Winnebago City, Minnesota – November 6, 1958) was a member of the Nebraska State Senate.

He graduated from New Lisbon High School in New Lisbon, Wisconsin in 1888. Later, Siman graduated from Morningside College. In 1898, he settled in Winside, Nebraska.

Siman married May B. Sullivan. They had two sons. He was a Methodist.

Career
Siman was a member of the Senate from 1918 to 1920. Previously, he was elected Attorney of Wayne County, Nebraska in 1902 and was Street Commissioner of Sioux City, Iowa from 1895 to 1897. He was a Republican.

References

People from Winnebago, Minnesota
People from New Lisbon, Wisconsin
Politicians from Sioux City, Iowa
People from Wayne County, Nebraska
Republican Party Nebraska state senators
Nebraska lawyers
Methodists from Nebraska
20th-century Methodists
Morningside University alumni
Iowa lawyers
1869 births
1958 deaths
District attorneys in Nebraska